Eig or EIG may refer to:

People 
 Alexander Eig (1894–1938), Israeli botanist
 Jonathan Eig (born 1964), American journalist and author
 Sam Eig (–1982), American real estate developer and philanthropist

Places 
 Eigg, an island of Scotland
 Eik, Vest-Agder, Norway

Other uses 
 Economic Interest Group, a type of French company
 Edmonton Investors Group, a Canadian sports management company
 Ei Group, a British pub group
 Electromagnetically induced grating
 Endurance International Group, an American web hosting company
 Environmental Integrity Group, a group of six parties to the United Nations Framework Convention on Climate Change
 Europe India Gateway, a submarine telecommunications cable system